SD Eibar Femenino is a Spanish women's football team from Eibar, Gipuzkoa, Basque Country, currently playing in the Primera Federación. It is the women's section of SD Eibar.

Below the first team, the club also incorporates a senior B-team playing at the provincial fourth level, plus three youth teams.

History
Eibar women's team was founded in 1991 as Eibartarrak Futbol Taldea. Eibartarrak reached the Copa de la Reina final and won the Supercopa in 1999, and was the League's runner-up two years later. However, it wasn't included in the unified 2001–2002 Superliga Femenina, instead playing in Primera Nacional. In 2003 it adopted SD Eibar's name (as Eibar-Eibartarrak) and kit, while remaining an independent club.

In 2009 it finally became a section of SD Eibar, and was promoted to the Superliga following a reform of the competition. Eibar was relegated two years later.

In 2017–18, Eibar posted their best result for a decade with a 3rd-place finish in the second tier, in a season which was seen as successful for all teams attached to the club.

In 2019–20, Eibar was granted promotion to the Primera División as the team ranked second behind Athletic Club Femenino's reserve team (not eligible for promotion) when the league was ended prematurely due to the COVID-19 pandemic.

Players

Current squad
.

Season by season

Notable players

Honours
As Eibartarrak
Liga Nacional (first tier): runners-up 2000–01
Copa de la Reina: runners-up 1999
Supercopa de España: 1999
As Eibar
Basque Regional League (third tier): 2014–15

References

External links
Eibar at Txapeldunak

Women's football clubs in Spain
SD Eibar
1991 establishments in Spain
Football clubs in the Basque Country (autonomous community)
Segunda Federación (women) clubs
Primera División (women) clubs
Association football clubs established in 1991
Primera Federación (women) clubs